These are the official results of the Women's 100 metres hurdles event at the 1972 Summer Olympics in Munich. The competition was held on the 4 & 8 of September. This was the first time this distance for women was held at the Olympics; the previous distance of 80 metres were discontinued after the 1968 Games. Pam Kilborn and Karin Balzer were back for their third Olympic games.

Heats
The top four runners in each heat advanced to the semifinal round.

Heat one

Heat two

Heat three

Heat four

Semifinals

Top four in each heat advanced to the final round.

Heat one

Heat two

Final

Key: WR = world record; OR = Olympic record; DNS = did not start; DNF = did not finish

References

Women's 1500 metres hurdles
Sprint hurdles at the Olympics
1972 in women's athletics
Women's events at the 1972 Summer Olympics